Vergano is an Italian surname. Notable people with the surname include:

Aldo Vergano (1891–1957), Italian director, screenwriter and journalist
Cristina Vergano (born 1960), Italian-American painter and designer
Serena Vergano (born 1943), Italian actress

Italian-language surnames